The 1942 Brooklyn Dodgers season was their 13th in the league. The team failed to improve on their previous season's output of 7–4, winning only three games. They failed to qualify for the playoffs for the 11th consecutive season and were shut out in five of their eleven games.

Schedule

Standings

References

Brooklyn Dodgers (NFL) seasons
Brooklyn Dodgers (NFL)
Brooklyn
1940s in Brooklyn
Flatbush, Brooklyn